Knights (also known as Knight) is an unincorporated community in Jasper County, in the U.S. state of Missouri.

History
A post office called Knight was established in 1881, and remained in operation until 1888. The community was named after the proprietor of a local trading post.

References

Unincorporated communities in Jasper County, Missouri
Unincorporated communities in Missouri